Yellowhead Trail is a  expressway segment of the Yellowhead Highway (Highway 16) in northern Edmonton, Alberta, Canada.  It carries a significant amount of truck traffic to and from the industrial areas of north Edmonton and serves as a key commuter route for the bedroom communities of Stony Plain, Spruce Grove, and Sherwood Park, carrying nearly 80,000 vehicles per weekday in 2015.  A suburban bypass of the route was completed when the northeast leg of Anthony Henday Drive (Highway 216) opened in late 2016, providing an alternate route through north Edmonton.

The Yellowhead Highway becomes Yellowhead Trail at Edmonton's westerly border, 231 Street. The rural divided highway meets Anthony Henday Drive at a large interchange, crossing over the Canadian National Railway and veering slightly northeast through industrial areas of northwestern Edmonton. The expressway passes underneath St. Albert Trail and past Canadian National's Walker Yard to 97 Street. Bending south near the neighbourhood of Eastwood and back to the east, it intersects Wayne Gretzky Drive and Victoria Trail before descending across the North Saskatchewan River near Beverly to a second large interchange with Anthony Henday Drive, at which the Yellowhead Trail designation ends and Highway 16 enters Strathcona County.

As a portion of the Yellowhead Highway, the expressway takes its name from Yellowhead Pass, through which Highway 16 passes from Alberta into British Columbia.  Construction was planned in the 1970s and was fully completed by 1984, receiving incremental improvements in subsequent decades; the route now includes a mix of signalized at-grade intersections and interchanges.  Due to heavy congestion, Edmonton outlined a $1 billion plan in late 2016 to upgrade Yellowhead Trail to a freeway, eliminating at-grade intersections and constructing new interchanges.  Work began in 2019 and is planned for completion in late 2027.

Route description
Designated as Highway 16 in all four provinces it traverses, the Yellowhead Highway is an interprovincial route that runs from the Pacific coast of British Columbia through Alberta and Saskatchewan into Manitoba, ending in Winnipeg.  It enters Alberta at Yellowhead Pass, travelling east into the Edmonton Capital Region as a four-lane rural divided highway that adopts the name "Yellowhead Trail" at 231 Street, marking the western Edmonton city limit.  The first interchange within the city is a diamond interchange at Winterburn Road; the divided highway then meets the Anthony Henday Drive ring road at a large combination interchange.  Widening to six lanes, Yellowhead assumes the unsigned designation of northbound Highway 2 from Henday and passes underneath 184 Street and over the Canadian National Railway, veering slightly northeast into the Armstrong Industrial Area.  It intersects 170 Street at another diamond interchange, then bends east past the Hawin Park Estate, and Dominion industrial areas of northwest Edmonton.  After an interchange at 156 Street, the road meets 149 Street at-grade before curving east to an interchange at St. Albert Trail, which ends the concurrency and adopts the Highway 2 designation by carrying it north into St. Albert.

East of St. Albert Trail, the expressway passes north of the Sherbrooke and Prince Charles neighbourhoods and intersects 127 and 121 Streets at-grade, running between Canadian National's Walker Yard and a large area formerly occupied by the Edmonton City Centre Airport. Following the railway corridor, it descends slightly to single-point urban interchanges at 97 and 82 Streets. At Elmwood Park the route curves southeast to intersect Wayne Gretzky Drive and Fort Road; the former is an expressway that proceeds south across the river toward downtown while the latter becomes Manning Drive and later Highway 15 to the north. Meanwhile, Yellowhead Trail crosses 66 Street at-grade prior to a diamond interchange at 50 Street. Climbing from the river valley, the expressway crosses into Strathcona County which officially ends the Yellowhead Trail designation immediately west of a second large combination interchange with Anthony Henday Drive. Highway 16 continues past Sherwood Park toward Lloydminster at the Saskatchewan border.

History

In the 1960s, Highway 16 followed portions of Stony Plain Road, Mayfield Road, 111 Avenue, 109 Street, and 118 Avenue through north Edmonton. The need for a free-flow bypass was identified, initially proposed when the City of Edmonton commissioned the 1963 Metro Edmonton Transportation Study (METS).  The plan proposed a downtown freeway loop with feeder routes, including an eastern approach via 98 Avenue, a northeastern approach parallel to Fort Road, and a western approach, known as the Jasper Freeway, via the MacKinnon Ravine and 100 Avenue which would have directly connected with Highway 16 west. In the late 1960s and early 1970s, Alberta expanded Highway 16 east of Edmonton, with connections to 98 Avenue in mind.  A major interchange at Highway 16A (present-day Anthony Henday Drive) opened in 1971 and an interchange at Highway 16A and Highway 14X (present-day Anthony Henday Drive and Baseline Road, respectively) opened in 1975, featuring grading for a future eastbound to northbound flyover that was ultimately not constructed.

The western freeway through the North Saskatchewan River valley and McKernan Ravine was the most controversial aspect of the plan, with public protests suspending construction shortly after clearing work had begun.  In tandem with cost overruns, the project was cancelled in 1974.  The cancellation of the METS freeway resulted in an alternate bypass route to be considered for Highway 16.  At the time, 125 Avenue and Santa Rosa Road were collector roads which ran parallel to the Canadian National Railway; 125 Avenue was interrupted by the Edmonton Industrial Airport but the city had planned to connect the two segments to form an arterial roadway.  In 1977, Alberta and Edmonton entered a cost-sharing agreement for the construction of Yellowhead Trail which included the expansion of 125 Avenue and Santa Rosa Road between 156 Street and 118 Avenue near the North Saskatchewan River, and a new extension westward to Highway 16X, which at the time entered Edmonton along 118 Avenue. Construction commenced in the late 1970s and was completed in 1984 with Yellowhead Trail as a 4-6 lane roadway.  Interchanges opened at 118 Avenue / Victoria Trail in 1978, 97 Street and St. Albert Trail in 1982, and 170 Street in 1983.  Following the completion of Yellowhead Trail, provincial highway designations were decommissioned within Edmonton's inner city; Highway 16 was designated to follow Yellowhead Trail east of 170 Street and Highway 2 followed Yellowhead Trail from St. Albert Trail to 170 Street before it continued south to Whitemud Drive and Calgary Trail.

Yellowhead Trail was improved throughout the late 1980s and 1990s, firstly with interchanges opening at 82 Street in 1988 and later at Fort Road.  A new Capilano Drive (now Wayne Gretzky Drive) extension opened in 1995, and interchanges opened at 50 Street in 1996, Anthony Henday Drive on the west side of the city 1998; and Winterburn Road in 1999.  In 1997, Highway 16X was renumbered to Highway 16 resulting in Yellowhead Trail having a contiguous highway number for its entire length. Interchanges were opened at 184 Street in 2004 and 156 Street in 2007.

Future
Due to heavy traffic volume, much of which is large trucks, Edmonton sought funding to upgrade Highway 16 within the bounds of Anthony Henday Drive to a freeway.  In 2016, the city unveiled plans for a $1 billion freeway upgrade to the expressway, eliminating at-grade intersections and constructing new interchanges.  Design work is underway and construction is tentatively scheduled to begin in 2019 and be completed by 2026.

Major intersections

References

External links
Yellowhead Trail Freeway Conversion – City of Edmonton

Freeways in Alberta
Roads in Edmonton
Urban segments of the Trans-Canada Highway
Yellowhead Highway